Balsac may refer to:
 Balsac the Jaws of Death (born 1950), character and guitarist in the rock band Gwar
 Balsac, Aveyron, France
 BALSAC (database), a Quebec population database
 Henri Heim de Balsac (1899–1979), French zoologist

See also 
 Balzac (disambiguation)